NWHL may refer to:

National Women's Hockey League, the original name of the Premier Hockey Federation, a professional women's hockey league established in 2015
National Women's Hockey League (1999–2007), a defunct professional women's hockey league
North West Hockey League, a minor pro men's hockey league that existed from 1933 to 1936